Videogame Nation is a British entertainment television series produced by Ginx TV, focusing on video games. It was broadcast on Challenge from 30 March 2014 to 11 June 2016.

Background
It was originally presented by Tom Deacon (who was later replaced by Nathan Caton) and Emily Hartridge. The original version of the show was negatively received by viewers, so on 16 August 2014, it was completely revamped with new hosts Dan Maher (Explosive Alan), John Robertson (who first appeared as a guest, before becoming a regular host and contributor), and Aoife Wilson (Eurogamer).

Episodes
This is a list of Videogame Nation episodes, the first 20 episodes did not have a specific title or focus.

Series 1 (2014)

Series 2 (2015)

Series 3 (2015)

Series 4 (2016)

References

External links

2014 British television series debuts
2016 British television series endings
Television shows about video games
Video gaming in the United Kingdom